Mohammadabad-e Andaleyb (also Romanized as Moḩammadābād-e ʿAndaleyb; also known as Moḩammadābād and Hendābād) is a village in Pain Velayat Rural District, in the Central District of Kashmar County, Razavi Khorasan Province, Iran. At the 2006 census, its population was 62, in 18 families.

References 

Populated places in Kashmar County